USSR most commonly refers to the Soviet Union (Union of Soviet Socialist Republics, 1922–1991).

USSR may also refer to:

The Ukrainian Soviet Socialist Republic (1919–1991)
The Polish Soviet Republic
The Hungarian Soviet Republic
The Czechoslovak Soviet Republic
The Uzbek Soviet Socialist Republic (1924–1991)
The Romanian Soviet Republic
The Bulgarian Soviet Socialist Republic
The Estonian Soviet Republic
The Union of Soviet Sovereign Republics, a proposed replacement state for the Union of Soviet Socialist Republics
USSR, a former Soviet magazine distributed in the United States; its modern successor is Russian Life
"U.S.S.R." (song), a hit song by eurodance singer Eddy Huntington, recorded in 1986
 "U.S.S.R.", a bonus track from a reissue of Siamese Dream by Smashing Pumpkins

See also
 CCCP (disambiguation)
Soviet Union (disambiguation), including Sovetsky Soyuz